Robert Sorin Neciu (born 10 January 1999) is a Romanian professional footballer who plays as a defender.

References

External links
 
 

1999 births
Living people
People from Roșiorii de Vede
Romanian footballers
Romania youth international footballers
Association football defenders
Liga I players
FC Viitorul Constanța players
AFC Chindia Târgoviște players
Liga II players
FCV Farul Constanța players
FC Universitatea Cluj players
FC Botoșani players